"Gangsta's Paradise" is a single by American rapper Coolio. Interpolating Stevie Wonder's 1976 song "Pastime Paradise", the single was released on August 1, 1995. The song features vocals from American singer L.V. who served as a co-composer and co-lyricist with Coolio and Doug Rasheed, with Wonder also being credited for the composition and lyrics. Certified Platinum in October, the song was included on Coolio's second album Gangsta's Paradise in November 1995.

The song was the number one biggest-selling single of 1995 on U.S. Billboard. In 2008, it was ranked number 38 on VH1's 100 Greatest Songs of Hip Hop. NME listed the song at number 100 in their ranking of "100 Best Songs of the 1990s" in 2012. Coolio was awarded a Grammy for Best Rap Solo Performance, two MTV Video Music Awards for Best Rap Video and Best Video from a Film and a Billboard Music Award for the song/album. The song was voted as the best single of the year in The Village Voice Pazz & Jop critics' poll.

The song has sold over five million copies in the United States, United Kingdom, and Germany. Coolio performed this song live at the 1995 Billboard Music Awards with L.V. and Wonder, and at the 38th Annual Grammy Awards with L.V.

Background and writing 
Coolio, L.V. and Doug Rasheed composed "Gangsta's Paradise" and wrote its lyrics, with Rasheed also serving as the song's producer. Stevie Wonder received crediting for the composition and lyrics due to the interpolation of his song "Pastime Paradise" from his 1976 album Songs in the Key of Life.

The song begins with a line from Psalm 23:4: "As I walk through the valley of the shadow of death", but then diverges with: "I take a look at my life and realize there's nothing left." Adding to some of the religious overtones are choral vocals in the background. Coolio freestyled the first couple of lines, with the rest of the lyrics coming to him quickly in one sitting. He would later claim that the song ultimately came from a source outside himself, saying: "'Gangsta's Paradise' wanted to be born; it wanted to come to life, and it chose me as the vessel."

Due to the sampling of Stevie Wonder's music, "Gangsta's Paradise" is one of the few Coolio tracks that did not contain any profanity, as Wonder did not appreciate his song being paired with profanity. Coolio said, "I had a few vulgarities...and he wasn't with that. So I changed it. Once he heard it, he thought it was incredible."

Critical reception 
Bill Lamb from About.com described the song as "riveting and atmospheric". James Masterton for Dotmusic noted "the undoubted brilliance" of the track. David Browne from Entertainment Weekly said it "may be the bleakest tune ever to top the pop singles chart." He added, "With its ghostly choir and lyrics about a gun-toting 23-year-old who kneels in the streetlight wondering if he’ll live to see 24, it examines the abyss with journalistic coolness." Tom Ewing of Freaky Trigger declared it as "complete pop greatness". Mike Wood from Idolator called it a "rap rhapsody". Pan-European magazine Music & Media commented: "Last year, this rapper hit paydirt with a reworking of Lakeside's Fantastic Voyage. This time around, he pulls off the same trick with this tall tale founded on Stevie Wonder's Pastime Paradise. Unlike the original, which surprisingly never was a hit, this one was a US number 1 and has every chance of succeeding in Europe." A reviewer from Music Week rated it four out of five, adding: "An infectious release from Grammy-nominated rapper that challenges the assumed form of the genre. Number one in the US and could do big things here." The magazine's Alan Jones deemed it "a brooding and menacing track".

Chart performance 
The single reached number one in the United States, United Kingdom, Ireland, France, Germany, Italy, Sweden, Austria, Denmark, Netherlands, Norway, Switzerland, Australia, and New Zealand, making it Coolio's most successful single. In Australia, the song stayed at No. 1 for 14 weeks, a record that would only be broken 22 years later by Ed Sheeran's "Shape of You". Following Coolio's appearance on Celebrity Big Brother 6, it re-entered the UK singles chart peaking at No. 31. In the United Kingdom, "Gangsta's Paradise" is the first rap single to sell over a million copies.

In the United States, the single spent twelve weeks in the top two of the Billboard Hot 100, of which three were spent at No. 1 and nine at No. 2. The song was certified triple platinum by the RIAA on February 23, 1996, indicating 3 million copies sold.  It has sold a further 1.8 million downloads in the US in the digital era . As of September 2022, the songs has sold 1.9 million downloads in US and has accumulated 763.1 million streams.

Following Coolio's death on September 28, 2022, "Gangsta's Paradise" debuted two days later at number 5 on the UK Official Singles Sales Chart Top 100, and reentered the Official Top 100 Singles Chart on 7 October 2022 at number 55.

Music video 
The accompanying music video for the song was directed by Antoine Fuqua and featured Michelle Pfeiffer reprising her earlier role in Dangerous Minds. Initially Coolio was concerned with the video's treatment stating, "I wanted some low-riders and some shit in it; I was trying to take it 'hood'." Despite this he trusted Fuqua and was ultimately pleased with the final result.

For the music video, Coolio won the Best Rap Video at the MTV Video Music Awards in 1996.

The music video hit one billion YouTube views in July 2022.

Cast and credits 
 Michelle Pfeiffer
 Coolio
 Directed by: Antoine Fuqua
 Sound editor: Jeff Clark

Impact and legacy 
In 1996, "Gangsta's Paradise" was named Best Rap 12-inch at the International Dance Music Awards in Miami.

In 1999, The Village Voice listed the song number 4 in their list of "Top Singles of the 90's".Rocklist.net..Jeff Brown's Village Voice Lists - Best of the '80's & '90's

In 2008, it was ranked number 38 on VH1's "100 Greatest Songs of Hip Hop".

In 2012, NME listed the song at number 100 in their ranking of "100 Best Songs of the 1990s".

In 2019, Billboard placed it at number 20 in their ranking of "Billboards Top Songs of the '90s". Same year, Stacker placed it at number 19 in their list of "Best 90s pop songs".

In July 2020, digital publication The Pudding carried out a study on the most iconic songs from the '90s and songs that are most known by Millennials and the people of Generation Z. "Gangsta's Paradise" was the song with the twelfth highest recognisability rate.

Parodies and covers 
There are several parodies of the song, including "Amish Paradise" by "Weird Al" Yankovic, which was released the following year, reaching number 53 on the U.S. chart. Coolio claimed that he did not give permission for the parody, which led to disagreements between the two. Yankovic claimed that he had been told Coolio had given the go-ahead through his record label, and apologized. Because of this incident, Yankovic now seeks approval for song parodies through the artists themselves, rather than communicating through intermediaries.  Coolio himself said in a 2011 interview that he had since "apologized to him (Yankovic)", further stating in a Rolling Stone retrospective that objecting to the parody "was probably one of the least smart things I've done over the years."

L.V. released a solo version of the single in 1996 on his debut album, I Am L.V. This version did not feature Coolio, and featured additional lyrics written by L.V. himself, with rap lyrics written by Scarface and Dani Blooms.

In 1996, the song was covered by Battery for the electro-industrial various artists compilation Operation Beatbox and their 1996 album, Distance. American post-hardcore band In Fear And Faith covered the song in 2008. Austrian melodic death metal band Artas covered the song in 2008 on the album The Healing. In 2014, post-hardcore band Falling in Reverse covered the song for the compilation album Punk Goes 90s Vol. 2. The video included an appearance by Coolio. In 2015, Postmodern Jukebox produced a version in a 1920s jazz style. That same year, New Zealand hard rock band Like a Storm covered the song on their second studio album, Awaken the Fire.

In other media 
It was first used in the 1995 drama film Dangerous Minds and was featured in its soundtrack.
 In 2011, the song featured in the comedy film Bad Teacher.
 The song featured in the superhero film The Green Hornet.
 The song appears in the 2013 action comedy film Pain & Gain.
 The song was also featured in various official trailers for the 2014 US comedy film Tammy, which stars Melissa McCarthy.
 In 2019, the song was used in the original trailer for Sonic the Hedgehog.

Accolades 
Billboard
 Billboard Year-End Chart-Toppers 1995
 Top Hot 100 Single number one
 Top Hot 100 Single Sales number one (2.5 million copies) (2× platinum)
Grammy Awards
 Best Rap Solo Performance
 Record of the Year (nominated)
MTV
 MTV Video Music Awards 1996
 Best Rap Video

Track listings

Charts

Weekly charts

Year-end charts

Decade-end charts

All-time charts

Certifications and sales

References

External links 
 Rock on the Net

1995 songs
1995 singles
Billboard Hot 100 number-one singles
Coolio songs
Dutch Top 40 number-one singles
European Hot 100 Singles number-one singles
Film theme songs
G-funk songs
Gangsta rap songs
Grammy Award for Best Rap Solo Performance
Irish Singles Chart number-one singles
MCA Records singles
Music videos directed by Antoine Fuqua
Number-one singles in Australia
Number-one singles in Austria
Number-one singles in Finland
Number-one singles in Germany
Number-one singles in Iceland
Number-one singles in Italy
Number-one singles in New Zealand
Number-one singles in Norway
Number-one singles in Scotland
Number-one singles in Sweden
Number-one singles in Switzerland
Number-one singles in Zimbabwe
SNEP Top Singles number-one singles
Songs about crime
Songs about poverty
Songs written by Stevie Wonder
Songs written for films
Tommy Boy Records singles
UK Singles Chart number-one singles
Ultratop 50 Singles (Flanders) number-one singles
Ultratop 50 Singles (Wallonia) number-one singles
Warner Records singles